Bychowskicotylidae is a family of monogeneans in the order Mazocraeidea. The name of the family, and of its type-genus Bychowskicotyle, was created to honour Boris Evseevitch Bychowsky, a Soviet scientist and parasitologist, specialist of monogeneans.

Genera
Bychowskicotyle Lebedev, 1969 
Gaterina Lebedev, 1969
Tonkinopsis Lebedev, 1972 
Yamaguticotyla Price, 1959

References

Polyopisthocotylea
Platyhelminthes families